Doug Silverberg is a Canadian retired ice hockey defenseman who was a two-time All-American for Colorado College.

Career
Silverberg began attending Colorado College in 1952 and joined the varsity team a year later. After a good sophomore season, he led the Tigers' defensive corps as the team climbed back to the top of the WIHL in 1955, earning recognition as an AHCA First Team All-American. CC shut down St. Lawrence in the semifinal to reach their third championship game but they ran into a stellar goaltending performance from Lorne Howes and fell to rival Michigan 3–5.

In Silverberg's senior season, Colorado College regressed just enough to allow Michigan Tech to slip past them in the standings and the team failed to reach the tournament. Silverberg was still regarded as one of the best defenders in the country and he was both a conference All-Star and national All-American.

Statistics

Regular season and playoffs

Awards and honors

References

External links

Living people
Canadian ice hockey defencemen
Colorado College Tigers men's ice hockey players
Ice hockey people from Alberta
Sportspeople from Red Deer, Alberta
AHCA Division I men's ice hockey All-Americans
1933 births